Deborah Lynn "Debra" Ochs (born January 30, 1966) is an American archer who was a member of the American squad that won the team bronze medals at the 1988 Summer Olympics. She also competed in the individual event, finishing in 26th place. Ochs was born in Howell, Michigan.

References

1966 births
Living people
American female archers
Archers at the 1988 Summer Olympics
Olympic bronze medalists for the United States in archery
Medalists at the 1988 Summer Olympics
Pan American Games silver medalists for the United States
Pan American Games medalists in archery
Archers at the 1983 Pan American Games
Medalists at the 1983 Pan American Games
21st-century American women